The  is a Japanese railway line which connects  in Higashi-ku, Nagoya, Aichi Prefecture with  in Seto, Aichi. It is owned and operated by the private railway operator Meitetsu.

Stations

Rolling stock
 3300 series (since 17 September 2016)
 4000 series (since October 2008)

Former rolling stock
 3770 series
 3730 series
 3780 series
 6000 series
 6600 series
 6750 series

History
The Seto Automatic Railway opened the Owari Seto to Yada section in 1905, and extended it to Ozone the following year. The passenger service was provided by steam-powered railcars, but as these proved to be underpowered, the line was electrified in 1907 at 600 V DC, the company changing its name to Seto Electric Railway at that time.

In 1911, the line was extended to Horikawa (since closed), and the Horikawa to Ozone section was double-tracked in 1914. The Ozone to Owari Seto section was double-tracked between 1921 and 1929.

In 1939, the company merged with Meitetsu. The Horikawa to Shimizu section closed in 1976 to allow for the construction of the new line to Sakaemachi and the connection to the Nagoya Subway Higashiyama Line, which opened in 1978, the voltage on the line being raised to 1,500 V DC, and freight services ceasing the same year.

References
This article incorporates material from the corresponding article in the Japanese Wikipedia.

Rail transport in Aichi Prefecture
Seto Line
1067 mm gauge railways in Japan